The Bakri Balloon is a medical device invented and designed by Dr. Younes Bakri in 1999. 

The obstetrical balloon is a 24 French, 54 cm-long, silicone catheter with a filling capacity of 500 mL. The device is used for the temporary control and reduction of postpartum hemorrhage (PPH).

According to the World Health Organization, around 100,000 maternal deaths occur every year from PPH and is the leading cause of maternal mortality in the developed world.

Use
The Bakri Balloon is a silicone, obstetrical balloon specifically designed to treat postpartum hemorrhage (PPH). The device is used for the "temporary control or reduction of postpartum hemorrhage when conservative management of uterine bleeding is warranted."

Cases
One study in Finland involving 50 patients recorded an overall  success rate of 86% when using the Bakri Balloon in managing PPH.  A German study involving 20 patients cited an overall success rate of 90% when the balloon is used in combination with B-Lynch sutures.

Endorsements
Both the International Federation of Gynaecology and Obstetrics (FIGO) and the International Confederation of Midwives (ICM) have approved the balloon as one of the primary support tools in treating PPH.

In 2021, the World Health Organization recommended the Bakri Balloon as part of its guidelines to help reduce the maternal mortality ratio to less than 70 per 100 000 live births by 2030.

See also
 Postpartum hemorrhage
 Maternal death

References

Complications of labour and delivery
Medical equipment